The Frente de Todos (translated as "Everyone's Front") is a coalition of Peronist and Kirchnerist political parties in Argentina formed to support President Alberto Fernández and Vice President Cristina Kirchner.

Fernández won the 2019 general election with over 48% of the vote, defeating incumbent Mauricio Macri in the first round. The coalition currently holds a minority in both the Argentine Senate and the Chamber of Deputies; in both houses it is conformed as a unified bloc.

Ideology
The Frente de Todos is a coalition that seeks to create a union of all sectors of Peronism (including Kirchnerism), progressivism and social democracy, including political parties of the centre-left and left-wing, in order to avoid the continuation of the Mauricio Macri presidency.

The front has the support of the most of the labor unions, such as the General Confederation of Labour (CGT) and the Argentine Workers' Central Union (CTA), as well as many social organizations known as piqueteros.

History
After former Vice Presient Daniel Scioli's defeat in the 2015 general election and the subsequent fragmentation of Peronism, former President Cristina Fernández de Kirchner created a new movement, called Citizen's Unity, which sought to win a majority in Congress and defeat the ruling Cambiemos coalition. However, in the 2017 legislative election, Citizen's Unity only came second with 25.21% of the votes.

On 12 June 2019, the Peronist Front for All coalition was announced through a video that was posted on the official social media accounts of Alberto Fernández and Cristina Kirchner.

In the primary elections of 11 August 2019, the coalition won with 49.49% compared to 32.94% for Juntos por el Cambio. Again in the 27 October elections, Alberto Fernandez won, with 48.24%, compared to 40.28% for Juntos por el Cambio.

On 10 December 2019, with a huge march in favor of the new government, Alberto Fernández and Cristina Fernández de Kirchner, sworn-in in as President and Vice President of Argentina. At nightfall, in the Casa Rosada, the assumption of the new president was celebrated with dances, lights, fireworks and speeches.

2021 post-electoral crisis 
The coalition suffered a severe internal crisis after the holding of the primaries in the 2021 Argentine legislative election. It occurred after the results of said primary, in which the front was defeated in the main districts, particularly in the City of Buenos Aires and the Buenos Aires province. Three days later, on September 15, eight officials, all of them aligned with Vice President Cristina Fernández, made their resignation available to President Fernández. The list of the first resigners includes Eduardo de Pedro, Martín Soria, Roberto Salvarezza, Luana Volnovich, Fernanda Raverta, Tristán Bauer, Paula Español and Juan Cabandié.

On 14 November 2021, Frente de Todos lost its majority in Congress for the first time in almost 40 years in midterm legislative elections. The election victory of the center-right coalition, Juntos por el Cambio (Together for Change), meant a tough final two years in office for President Alberto Fernández. Losing control of the Senate made it difficult for him to make key appointments, including to the judiciary. While it remained the largest force in Congress, it also forced him to negotiate with the opposition every initiative he sends to the legislature.

Member parties

Electoral performance

President

Legislative elections

Chamber of Deputies

Senate

See also
 Front for Victory
 Citizen's Unity
 Justicialist Party

References

External links
 Official campaign website 

2019 establishments in Argentina
Centre-left parties in South America
Kirchnerism
Left-wing parties in Argentina
Left-wing political party alliances
Peronist parties and alliances in Argentina
Political parties established in 2019
Political party alliances in Argentina
Provincial political parties in Argentina